The 1978 Paris–Nice was the 36th edition of the Paris–Nice cycle race and was held from 5 March to 11 March 1978. The race started in Paris and finished in Nice. The race was won by Gerrie Knetemann of the TI–Raleigh team.

General classification

References

1978
1978 in road cycling
1978 in French sport
March 1978 sports events in Europe
1978 Super Prestige Pernod